Luiz Gustavo (born 1987), is a Brazilian football defensive midfielder currently at Fenerbahçe

Luiz Gustavo may also refer to:

Luiz Gustavo (footballer, born 1972), Brazilian former football forward
Luiz Gustavo (footballer, born 1994), Brazilian football defender for Cuiabá
Luiz Gustavo (footballer, born 1999), Brazilian football right-back for Arouca

See also
Luis Gustavo (actor) (1934–2021), Brazilian actor
Luís Gustavo (footballer) (born 1968), Brazilian former football midfielder
Luís Gustavo Ledes (born 1992), Portuguese footballer